In biostratigraphy, an acme zone, abundance zone, or peak zone is the area of a teilzone where a particular fossil taxon reaches a higher level of abundance.

See also
Biozone

References

Biostratigraphy